Bartholomew "Tristan" de Clermont-Lodève (1380), Count of Copertino, was a French-born knight who married Catherine Orsini del Balzo, youngest daughter of Mary of Enghien and Raimondo Orsini del Balzo, Prince of Taranto. He was the father of Isabella of Clermont, Princess of Taranto, the first consort of King Ferdinand I of Naples.

Documents and sources about Tristan, whose proper first name was Bartholomew, are scarce. Tristan de Clermont became Count of Cupertino by his wife's dowry.

In 1429 Tristan divided the inheritance between his children. They were:
Raymond de Clermont (Raimondello di Chiaramonte), died 2 March 1443, leaving his inheritance to his sister Sancia;
Sancia, who married Francesco del Balzo, Duke of Andria;
Margherita, who married Antonio Ventimiglia, Marquess of Geraci, Grand Admiral;
Antonia, alleged somewhere to have married Thomas Palaeologus, titular Despot of Morea, as brother of Emperor Constantin and heir presumptive to the throne of the Byzantine Empire;
Isabella, who married Ferdinand of Aragon, later King of Naples.

14th-century births
1430s deaths
15th-century French people
15th-century Italian nobility
Jure uxoris officeholders
Medieval French knights
Year of birth unknown
Year of death unknown
Counts of Italy
Christians of the Battle of Nicopolis